03 may refer to:


Dates
The years 1803, 1903, or 2003

Music
 03 (Twelve album), 2007 
 03 (Son of Dave album), 2008
 03 (Urban Zakapa album), 2013

Other uses
 03 numbers, a non-geographic telephone number range in the UK
 The number of the French department Allier
 The occupational field designator for U.S. Marine Corps Infantry
Tokyo Metro 03 series.

See also
 O3 (disambiguation)
 3 (disambiguation)
 3 (number)